The 2013 OFC Champions League Final was the final of the 2012–13 OFC Champions League, the 12th edition of the Oceania Cup, Oceania's premier club football tournament organized by the Oceania Football Confederation (OFC), and the 7th season under the current OFC Champions League name.

The final was contested between two New Zealand teams, Waitakere United and Auckland City, at Arena 2 of Mount Smart Stadium in Auckland, New Zealand, on 19 May 2013. The winner earned the right to represent the OFC at the 2013 FIFA Club World Cup, entering at the qualifying play-off round.

Auckland City won the final 2–1 to record their third consecutive and fifth overall Champions League title.

Background
This is the first ever OFC club final which involves two teams from the same country. Either Auckland City or Waitakere United have appeared in the previous seven OFC club finals. Auckland City are the two-time defending champions and have played in four previous finals, winning all of them (2006, 2009, 2011, and 2012), while Waitakere United have played in three previous finals, winning two (2007 and 2008) and losing one (2010).

Road to final

Note: In all results below, the score of the finalist is given first.

Rules
The final was played as a single match at a pre-determined venue (a change from previous OFC Champions League finals which had been played on a home-and-away two-legged basis). If tied after regulation, extra time and, if necessary, penalty shoot-out were used to decide the winner.

Match

References

External links

2013
1 Final
2012–13 in New Zealand association football